Atlanta pulchella is a species of sea snail, a holoplanktonic marine gastropod mollusk in the family Atlantidae.

Distribution
Distribution of Atlanta pulchella include North West Atlantic: off Massachusetts and Delaware.

Description
The maximum recorded shell length is 1.25 mm.

Habitat
Minimum recorded depth is 0 m. Maximum recorded depth is 0 m.

References

External links

Atlantidae
Gastropods described in 1884